Judy is a (usually) female personal name. It is sometimes a given name, but more often it is a hypocorism (affectionate diminutive of a personal name) which takes the place of a given name, usually Judith.

The great majority of persons named Judy are female, but not all.

People

Politics
Judy Agnew, wife of former American Vice President of the United States Spiro Agnew
Judy Baker (born 1960), American politician
Judy Bethel (born 1943), Canadian politician
Judy Biggert (born 1937), American politician
Judy Bonds (1952–2011), American anti-mountaintop-removal activist
Judy Boyle, American politician
Judy Bradley (born 1952), Canadian politician
Judy Burges (born 1943), American politician
Judy Chirco, American politician
Judy Chu (born 1953), American politician
Judy Clendening, Canadian judge
Judy Clibborn, American politician
Judy Darcy (born 1950), Canadian politician and national union executive
Judy Edwards (born 1955), Australian politician
Judy Emmons, American politician
Judy Erola (born 1934), Canadian politician
Judy Foote (born 1952), Canadian politician
Judy Fryd (1909–2000), British advocate for mentally handicapped children
Judy Gamin (1930–2022), Australian politician
Judy Gingell (born 1946), Canadian politician
Judy Goldsmith, American activist and President of NOW
Judy Gordon (1948–2020), Canadian politician
Judy Hopwood (born 1954), Australian politician
Judy Hughes (born 1959), Australian politician
Judy Jackson (born 1947), Australian politician
Judy Junor (born 1948), Canadian politician
Judy Kany (born 1937), American politician
Judy Keall (born 1942), New Zealand politician
Judy Koehler (born 1941), American politician
Judy Krawczyk (born 1939), American politician
Judy LaMarsh (1924–1980), Canadian politician, member of the federal cabinet, and author
Judy Lee (born 1942), American politician
Judy Maddigan (born 1948), Australian politician
Judy Mallaber (born 1951), British politician
Judy Manning (born 1943), American politician
Judy Manning, Canadian politician
Judy Martin (politician)
Judy Marsales, Canadian politician
Judy Martz (1943–2017), American skater politician, and Governor of Montana
Judy Mbugua (born 1947), Kenyan activist
Judy Mundey (born 1944), Canadian activist and communist
Judy Eason McIntyre (born 1945), American politician
Judy Nerat (1948–2012), American politician
Judy Paradis (born 1944), American politician
Judy Rebick (born 1945), Canadian activist and journalist
Judy Richardson, American activist and documentary film producer
Judy Robson (born 1939), American politician
Judy Rogers, Canadian politician
Judy Schwank (born 1951), American politician
Judy Sgro (born 1944), Canadian politician
Judy Sheerer (born 1940), American politician
Judy Shepard (born 1952), American activist
Judy Spence (born 1957), Australian politician
Judy Streatch (born 1966), Canadian politician
Judy Syjuco, Filipino politician
Judy Thongori, Kenyan women's rights activist
Judy Baar Topinka (1944–2014), American politician
Judy Turner (born 1956), New Zealand politician
Judy Wakhungu, Kenyan cabinet minister, executive, and academic
Judy Wasylycia-Leis (born 1951), Canadian politician
Judy Petty Wolf, American politician

Entertainment
Judy Bailey (born 1952/1953), New Zealand broadcaster
Judy Bailey (pianist) (born 1935), New Zealand jazz pianist 
Judy Banks Australian television host
Judy Becker, American film production designer
Judy Bennett (born 1943), English voice actor
Judy Blair (born 1948), Franco-American jazz and R&B singer and keyboardist
Judy Boucher, Vincentian reggae and R&B singer
Judy Brooke (born 1970), English actress
Judy Buxton (born 1949), English actress
Judy Campbell (1916–2004), British actress and cabaret singer
Judy Canova (1913–1983), American comedian, actress, pop singer, and radio personality
Judy Carmichael (born 1957), American jazz vocalist and pianist
Judy Carne (1939–2015), English actress
Judy Chamberlain (born 1944), American singer
Judy Cheeks (born 1954), American soul and R&B singer
Judy Clark (1921–2002), American actress
Judy Clay (1938–2001), American soul and gospel singer
Judy Collins (born 1939), American folk, popular, and art singer
Judy Cornwell (born 1940), English actress
Judy Craig (born 1946), American girl-group singer
Judy Craymer, English musical theater producer
Judy Dan (born 1931), Chinese–American actress
Judy Davis (born 1955), Australian actress
Judy Dearing (1940–1995) American costume designer
Judy Dyble (1949–2020), British singer–songwriter
Judy Farr (set decorator), British
Judy Farrell (born 1938), American actress
Judy Flynn (born c. 1963–1964), British actress
Judy Freudberg (1949–2012), American television screenwriter
Judy Garland (1922–1969), American pop singer and actress
Judy Adelman Gershon of Canadian children's music duo Judy & David
Judy Gold (born 1962), American comedian, actress, screenwriter, and producer
Judy Graubart (born 1943), American actress
Judy Finnigan (born 1948), English television personality and author
Judy Geeson (born 1948), English actress
Judy Gilroy, Irish television presenter
Judy Greer (born 1975), American actress
Judy Gringer (born 1941), Danish actress
Judy Gunn (1915–1991), British actress
Judy Henske (1936–2022), American singer–songwriter
Judy Herrera, American actress
Judy Holliday (1921–1965), American actress, comedian, and pop singer
Judy Holt, British actress
Judy Huxtable (born 1942), English actress
Judy Jack, Australian TV host of The Judy Jack Show and Geoff and Judy
Judy Jacobs (born 1957), American gospel musician
Judy Johnson (born 1928), American pop singer 
Judy Kaye (born 1948), American singer and actress
Judy Kelly (1913–1991), Australian-British actress
Judy Kuhn (born 1958), American actress and singer
Judy Landers (born 1958), American actress
Judy Landon, American actress
Judy Lewis (1935–2011), American Hollywood lovechild and actress
Judy Loe (born 1947), English actress
Judy Lynn (1936–2010), American singer and Miss Idaho 1955
Judy Lynne (born 1943), American-Australian actress
Judy Malcolm (1910–1998), American actress
Judy Marte (born 1983), American actress
Judy Martin (1917–1951), American country music singer 
Judy Matheson, British actress
Judy McBurney (1948–2018), Australian actress
Judy McDonald, American comedian
Judy Minx (born circa 1989), French pornographic actress
Judy Moorcroft (1933–1991), costume designer
Judy Morris (born 1947), Australian actress, director, and screenwriter
Judy Mowatt (born 1952), Jamaican reggae singer
Judy Munsen (born 1949), television and video game score composer
Judy Kay Newton, birth name of Juice Newton (born 1952), American country and pop singer
Judy Niemack (born 1954), American jazz vocalist
Judy Nugent (born 1940), American actress
Judy Nunn (born 1945), Australian actress, screenwriter, and novelist
Judy Ongg (born 1950), Taiwanese actress and singer
Judy Pace (born 1942), American actress
Judy Parfitt (born 1935), English actress
Judy Prescott, American actress and poet
Judy Reyes (born 1967), American actress
Judy Roderick (1942–1992), American folk and blues singer
Judy Rodman (born 1951), American country music singer
Judy Ann Santos (born 1978), Filipino actress and pop singer
Judy Sheindlin (born 1942), American television personality known as "Judge Judy"
Judy Shepherd (died 2009) of the Shepherd Sisters, American singing group
Judy Small, Australian singer–songwriter and judge
Judy Strangis (born 1949), American actress
Judy Street (born c. 1949), American soul singer
Judy Stone (born 1942), Australian pop and country music singer
Judy Norton Taylor (born 1958), American actress
Judy Tenuta (1956–2022), American comedian and musician
Judy Toll (1958–2002), American comedian and screenwriter
Judy Lee Tomerlin (born 1940), model
Judy Torres (born 1968), American electronic musician and singer
Judy Trammell (born 1958), American cheerleader and cheer choreographer
Judy Tyler (1932–1957), American actress
Judy Tyler (model), American (1947–2013)
Judy Tylor, birth name of Jud Tylor (born 1979), Canadian actress
Judy Wadsworth, Miss Nevada 1958
Judy Wilson (actress), English (1938—2006)
Judy Blye Wilson, American television casting director
Judy Weinstein, American dance music scene figure
Judy Weiss (born 1972), German theater and jazz singer
Judy Winter (born 1944), German actress

Athletics
Judy Amoore (born 1940), Australian runner
Judy Bell (born 1936), American golfer and golf executive
Judy Blumberg (born 1957), American ice dancer
Judy Canty (long jumper), Australian (1931–2016)
Judy Wills Cline (born 1948), American gymnast and acrobat
Judy Connor (born 1953), New Zealand tennis player
Judy Crawford (born 1951), Canadian skier
Judy-Joy Davies (1928–2016), Australian swimmer
Judy Devlin (born 1935), American badminton player
Judy Dickinson (born 1950), American golfer
Judy Diduck (born 1966), Canadian ice hockey player
Judy Dixon (born 1949), American tennis player and coach
Judy Doyle, Irish camogie player
Judy Esmond (born 1960), Australian cricket player
Judy Gans (1886–1949), American Negro leagues baseball player and manager
Judy Glenney (born 1949), American weightlifter and coach
Judy Goodrich (born 1939), American fencer
Judy Green (volleyball coach), American
Judy Grinham (born 1939), British swimmer
Judy Guinness (1910–1952), British fencer
Judy Hahn, American volleyball coach
Judy Harlan (1896–1978), American football (gridiron) player
Judy Johnson (1899–1989), American Negro leagues baseball player
Judy Kimball (born 1938), American golfer
Judy Leden (born 1959)), British hang glider and paraglider
Judy Long (born 1969), Chinese-Canadian table tennis player
Judy MacMillan (1865–1936), Scottish rugby player
Judy Martin (wrestler), American (born 1955)
Judy Melick (born 1954)), American swimmer
Judy Mosley-McAfee (1968–2013), American basketball player
Judy Nagel (born 1951), American skier
Judy Masters (1892–1955), Australian football (soccer) player
Judy Murray (born 1959), Scottish tennis coach
Judy Oakes (born 1958), British shot putter
Judy Peckham (born 1950), Australian runner
Judy Playfair (born 1953), Australian swimmer
Judy Porter, New Zealand football (soccer) player
Judy Rabinowitz (born 1958), American skier
Judy Rankin (born 1945), American golfer
Judy Reeder (born 1948), American swimmer
Judy Reynolds (born 1981), Irish dressage rider
Judy Rose, American basketball coach and athletic director
Judy Samuel (born 1943), British swimmer
Judy Schwomeyer (born 1950), American ice dancer
Judy Shapiro-Ikenberry (born 1942), American long-distance runner
Judy Simpson (born 1960), British heptathlete
Judy Sowinski (1940–2011), American roller derby skater and coach
Judy Strong (born 1960), American field hockey player
Judy Tegart (born 1937), Australian tennis player
Judy Vernon (born 1945), British hurdler

Academia
Judy Armitage (born 1951), British biochemist
Judy Baca (born 1946), American social science professor, artist, and activist
Judy Bonner, American academic executive
Judy Birmingham, English-Australian archaeologist 
Judy Clapp (born 1930), American computer scientist
Judy Delin, British linguist
Judy Dempsey (born 1956), Irish journalist and researcher
Judy Feder, American political scientist
Judy Franz (born 1938), American physicist
Judy Genshaft (born 1948), American academic executive
Judy Hample (born 1957), American academic executive
Judy Ho, Taiwanese-American psychologist, professor, and television personality
Judy Holdener (born 1965), American mathematician
Judy Illes (born 1960), American neurologist
Judy Klitsner, religion lecturer and writer
Judy Mikovits, American researcher
Judy Jolley Mohraz (born 1943), American women's studies historian and philanthropist
Judy Olian, American academic executive
Judy Roitman (born 1945), American mathematician
Judy Shepard-Kegl, American linguist
Judy Stamps, American ecologist
Judy Wajcman (born 1950), sociologist
Judy L. Walker, American mathematician
Judy Yung (1946–2020), American historian
Judy Zeh, American statistician

Literature
Judy Balan, Indian satirical writer
Judy Blume (born 1938), American children's and young adult novelist
Judy Blundell, American children's and young adult writer (under the name Jude Watson)
Judy Blunt (born 1954), American essayist
Judy Budnitz (born 1973), American fiction writer
Judy Clemens, American mystery writer
Judy Corbalis, New Zealand fiction writer
Judy Croome (born 1958), South African fiction writer and poet
Judy-Lynn del Rey (1943–1986), American science fiction editor
Judy Fong Bates (born 1949), Chinese-Canadian writer 
Judy GeBauer, American playwright 
Judy Grahn (born 1940), American poet and writer
Judy Jordan (born 1961), American poet
Judy Lucero (deceased), American poet
Judy Malloy (born 1942), American poet
Judy Pascoe, Australian novelist and acrobat
Judy Rothman, American screenwriter
Judy Troy, American fiction writer and literature professor
Judy Waite, British picture book writer and young adult novelist
Judy Upton (born 1967), British playwright

Journalism
Judy Bailey (born c. 1952–1953), Australian television news anchor
Judy Battista (born 1966), American sports journalist
Judy Bolch, American journalist
Judy Crichton (1929–2007), American television news producer
Judy Fortin, American television reporter and anchor
Judy Lee Klemesrud (1939–1985), American magazine and newspaper journalist
Judy Licht, American television reporter and fashion writer
Judy MacDonald (born 1964), Canadian magazine and television journalist, and writer
Judy Maddren, Canadian radio announcer
Judy Mann (1943–2005), American newspaper reporter
Judy Muller, American television reporter
Judy Stone (journalist) (1924–2017), American film critic
Judy Waytiuk, Canadian freelance writer and reporter
Judy Woodruff (born 1946), American television journalist and anchor

Fine arts
Judy Cassab (1920–2015), Australian painter
Judy Chicago (born 1939), American installation artist
Judy Clark (artist) (born 1949), British
Judy Dater (born 1941), American photographer
Judy Dunaway (born 1964), composer and sonic installation artist
Judy Fox (born 1957), American sculptor
Judy Fiskin (born 1945), American photographer and art film maker
Judy Francesconi (born 1957), American photographer
Judy Jensen (born 1953), American glass artist
Judy Millar (born 1957), New Zealand painter
Judy Watson Napangardi, Australian painter
Judy Nylon, Anglo-American multidisciplinary artist and punk rocker
Judy Pfaff (born 1946), American installation artist
Judy Radul (born 1962), American multimedia, performance, and installation artist
Judy Rifka (born 1945), American painter and video artist
Judy McIntosh Wilson (born 1937), New Zealand sculptor and fibre artist

Classical music
Judy Kang, Canadian violinist, producer, singer, and composer
Judy Klein (born 1943), American composer, pianist, and music educator

Crime and justice
Judy Amar, American burglar
Judy Buenoano (1943–1998), American murderer
Judy Clarke (born 1952), American criminal defense attorney
Judy Moran (born 1944), Australian gangster and murderer

Culinary arts
Judy Joo (born 1974), American restaurateur, chef, and television personality
Judy Mazel (1943–2007), author of "The Beverly Hills Diet"
Judy Rodgers (1956–2013), American chef and cookbook writer

Other
Judy Bentinck (born 1952), couture milliner
Judy Blame (1960–2018), English club hipster, stylist, designer, and art director
Judy Cannato, American retreat facilitator, spiritual director, and writer
Judy Feld Carr (born 1938), Canadian population rescuer 
Judy Gao (born 1994), New Zealand fashion designer and chess player
Judy Green (socialite) (1931–2001), American
Judy Harrow (1945–2014), American counselor,  Wiccan priestess, and writer
Judy Horacek (born 1961), Australian cartoonist, illustrator, and children's writer
Judy Hornby, British-American fashion designer
Judy Irving, American documentary filmmaker
Judy Lewent, American business executive
Judy McGrath (born 1952), American television executive
Judy Hoback Miller (born 1937), American Watergate scandal figure
Judy Nelson, American litigant and memoirist
Judy Shalom Nir-Mozes (born 1958), Israeli socialite and television host
Judy Peiser (born 1945), American folk music and folklore expert
Judy Castle Scott, American bind advocate and activist in the field of vision loss
Judy Smith, American crisis manager
Judy Spreckels (1933–2015), American confidante of Elvis Presley
Judy Hanna Beautiful princess in Syria

Fictional characters
Judy, a character in the 1984 American teen sex comedy movie Revenge of the Nerds
Judy, a character 1991 and 1994 American coming-of-age comedy-drama movies My Girl and My Girl 2
Judy, a character in the 2000 American comedy film The Photographer
Judy Álvarez, techie, braindance editor from Cyberpunk 2077 
Judy, wife of Pulcinella in Punch and Judy shows
Judy, another alias used by the character Judith Myers from the film Halloween
title character of the film Judy Berlin
Judy Bolton, protagonist of the Judy Bolton Series of books
Judy Brownlee, in the TV soap opera Shortland Street
Judy Foster, protagonist of the radio show A Date with Judy and film A Date with Judy
Judy Geller, recurring character in the TV show Friends
Judy Hensler, in the TV sitcom Leave It To Beaver
Judy Hopps, rabbit protagonist of the animated film Zootopia
Judy Jetson, cartoon character in the TV sitcom The Jetsons
Judy Miller, in the TV sitcom Still Standing
Judy Moody, protagonist of a series of books by Megan McDonald
Judy of the Jungle, golden-age comic book heroine
Judy Shepherd, a character in the film Jumanji 
Judy Stoneface, a news reporter of the No Nonsense News from The Fairly OddParents: Fairly Odder

See also
Judi
Judie
Judy (disambiguation)
Judith (disambiguation)

References

Feminine given names
Hypocorisms